Scythris mulanjensis is a moth of the family Scythrididae. It was described by Bengt Å. Bengtsson in 2014. It is found in Kenya and Malawi.

References

mulanjensis
Moths described in 2014